The scudo (plural: scudi) was the currency of the island Kingdom of Sardinia until 1816. It was subdivided into 2½ lire (singular: lira), each of 4 reales, 20 soldi, 120 cagliarese or 240 denari. The doppietta was worth 2 scudi. It was replaced by the Sardinian lira.

Coins
In the late 18th century, coins circulated in denominations of 1 and 3 cagliarese, 1 soldo, ½ and 1 reale, ¼, ½ and 1 scudo, 1, 2½ and 5 doppietta. The cagliarese denominations were struck in copper, the soldo and reale in billon, the scudo in silver and the doppietta in gold.

References

Currencies of Italy
Obsolete Italian currencies
Modern obsolete currencies
Kingdom of Sardinia
1816 disestablishments